John Gilbert "Jack" Beckner (June 9, 1930 – November 16, 2016) was an American artistic gymnast, coach and referee. He competed at the 1952, 1956 and 1960 Summer Olympics with the best individual result of seventh place on the vault and horizontal bar in 1956. His elder brother Dick was also part of the 1956 Olympic gymnastics team.

Beckner won the individual AAU all-around title in 1956–59. At the 1955 and 1959 Pan American Games he collected 8 gold medals, which remains one of the best achievements for any American athlete.

Beckner was born to Lola and Andrew Vernon Beckner. He studied at Los Angeles Valley College and the University of Southern California, graduating in 1953. In 1962 he earned a master's degree at the University of Southern California and coached there from 1969 to 1981. Previously he was a PE teacher and gymnastics coach and mentor at Van Nuys Jr High School from 1960 to 1967, then spent a year at Eagle Rock High School before becoming the gymnastics coach at USC. He also acted as the head coach for the 1968 USA gymnastics team for the 1968 Summer Olympics and served as a national and international judge. He was inducted into the U.S. Gymnastics Hall of Fame (1976), National Gymnastics Judges Association Hall of Fame (1989), USC Hall of Fame (2005) and Los Angeles High Schools Sports Hall of Fame (2011). Beckner was married to Barbara Blaine, they had three children. He died in his sleep aged 86.

References

1930 births
2016 deaths
American male artistic gymnasts
Gymnasts at the 1952 Summer Olympics
Gymnasts at the 1956 Summer Olympics
Gymnasts at the 1960 Summer Olympics
Olympic gymnasts of the United States
Pan American Games gold medalists for the United States
Pan American Games bronze medalists for the United States
Pan American Games medalists in gymnastics
Gymnasts at the 1955 Pan American Games
Gymnasts at the 1959 Pan American Games
Medalists at the 1955 Pan American Games
Medalists at the 1959 Pan American Games
Gymnasts from Los Angeles